Bayburt Dam is a dam in Kars Province, Turkey, built between 1995 and 2003.

See also
List of dams and reservoirs in Turkey

External links
DSI

Dams in Kars Province
Dams completed in 2003